Afritzer See is a lake of Carinthia, Austria.

Geography
The lake is situated in the Gegendtal Valley, running from east to west through the Nock Mountains range of the Gurktal Alps. Though the named after the settlement of Afritz on the eastern shore, the water is located within the municipal area of neighbouring Feld am See. A drainage divide separates it from the neighbouring Brennsee lake. Several brooks flow into Afritzer See, it empties via Afritzer Bach into the Drava river near Villach.

It is a popular bathing lake in summer, two public lidos and a camping site are located on the southern shore.

External links 

 Carinthian Institute of Limnology

Lakes of Carinthia (state)